A kinetic energy weapon (also known as kinetic weapon, kinetic energy warhead, kinetic warhead, kinetic projectile, kinetic kill vehicle) is a weapon based solely on a projectile's kinetic energy instead of an explosive or any other kind of payload.

The term Hit-to-kill, or kinetic kill, is also used in the military aerospace field to describe kinetic energy weapons. It has been used primarily in the anti-ballistic missiles (ABM) and anti-satellite weapons (ASAT) area, but some modern anti-aircraft missiles are also hit-to-kill. Hit-to-kill systems are part of the wider class of kinetic projectiles, a class that has widespread use in the anti-tank field.

Typical kinetic energy weapons are blunt projectiles such as rocks and round shots, pointed ones such as arrows, and somewhat pointed ones such as bullets. Among projectiles that do not contain explosives are those launched from railguns, coilguns, and mass drivers, as well as kinetic energy penetrators. All of these weapons work by attaining a high muzzle velocity, or initial velocity, generally up to hypervelocity, and collide with their targets, converting the kinetic energy associated with the relative velocity between the two objects into destructive shock waves and heat. Other types of kinetic weapons are accelerated over time by a rocket engine, or by gravity. In either case, it is this kinetic energy that destroys its target.

Basic concept
Kinetic energy is a function of mass and the velocity of an object. For a kinetic energy weapon in the aerospace field, both objects are moving and it is the relative velocity that is important. Because the interceptor may not be approaching head-on, a lower bound on the relative velocity on the order of  can be assumed, or converting to SI units, approximately 7150 meters per second.

At that speed, every kilogram of the interceptor will have an energy of:

TNT has an explosive energy of about 4853 joules per gram, or about 5 MJ per kilogram. That means the impact energy of the mass of the interceptor is over five times that of a detonating warhead of the same mass.

It may seem like this makes a warhead superfluous, but a hit-to-kill system has to actually hit the target, which may be on the order of half a meter wide, while a conventional warhead releases numerous small fragments that increase the possibility of impact over a much larger area, albeit with a much smaller impact mass. This has led to alternative concepts that attempt to spread out the potential impact zone without explosives. The SPAD concept of the 1960s used a metal net with small steel balls that would be released from the interceptor missile, while the Homing Overlay Experiment of the 1980s used a fan-like metal disk.

As the accuracy and speed of modern surface-to-air missiles (SAMs) improved, and their targets began to include theatre ballistic missiles (TBMs), many existing systems have moved to hit-to-kill attacks as well. This includes the MIM-104 Patriot, whose PAC-3 version removed the warhead and upgraded the solid fuel rocket motor to produce an interceptor missile that is much smaller overall, as well as the RIM-161 Standard Missile 3, which is dedicated to the anti-missile role.

Delivery
Some kinetic weapons for targeting objects in spaceflight are anti-satellite weapons and anti-ballistic missiles. Since in order to reach an object in orbit it is necessary to attain an extremely high velocity, their released kinetic energy alone is enough to destroy their target; explosives are not necessary. This saves costly weight and there is no detonation to be precisely timed. This method, however, requires direct contact with the target, which requires a more accurate trajectory. Some hit-to-kill warheads are additionally equipped with an explosive directional warhead to enhance the kill probability (e.g. Israeli Arrow missile or U.S. Patriot PAC-3).

With regard to anti-missile weapons, the Arrow missile and MIM-104 Patriot PAC-2 have explosives, while the Kinetic Energy Interceptor (KEI), Lightweight Exo-Atmospheric Projectile (LEAP, used in Aegis BMDS), and THAAD do not (see Missile Defense Agency).

A kinetic projectile can also be dropped from aircraft. This is applied by replacing the explosives of a regular bomb with a non-explosive material (e.g. concrete), for a precision hit with less collateral damage; these are called concrete bombs. It is also applied for training the act of dropping a bomb with explosives. This method has been used in Operation Iraqi Freedom and the subsequent military operations in Iraq by mating concrete-filled training bombs with JDAM GPS guidance kits, to attack vehicles and other relatively "soft" targets located too close to civilian structures for the use of conventional high explosive bombs.

Advantages and disadvantages
The primary advantage kinetic energy weapons is that they minimize the launch mass of the weapon, as no weight has to be set aside for a separate warhead. Every part of the weapon, including the airframe, electronics and even the unburned maneuvering fuel contributes to the destruction of the target. Lowering the total mass of the vehicle offers advantages in terms of the required launch vehicle needed to reach the required performance, and also reduces the mass that needs to be accelerated during maneuvering.

Another advantage of kinetic energy weapons is that any impact will almost certainly guarantee the destruction of the target. In contrast, a weapon using a blast fragmentation warhead will produce a large cloud of small fragments that will not cause as much destruction on impact. Both will produce effects that can easily be seen at long distance using radar or infrared detectors, but such a signal will generally indicate complete destruction in the case of a kinetic energy weapons while the fragmentation case does not guarantee a "kill".

See also 
 Hellfire R9X
 Terminal ballistics
 Exoatmospheric Kill Vehicle

Explanatory notes

References

Bibliography

External links 

Anti-ballistic missiles
Projectiles
Collision